Park Eun-ooh (born March 30, 1990), also known as NewNew, is a South Korean singer-songwriter, music producer and lyricist.

History

2000s
Park Eun-ooh made her debut as a singer in 2007 with her stage name Xeno(제노) and published her first album "Seventeen Xeno". In 2008, her live performance "Who are you? sexy My Boy" in which she was portrayed as a cross-dressing girl became a hit for her masculine voice and dance. However, she made her comeback within 2 weeks on another live in maiden dress where she totally reversed her previous image. She later on changed her stage name from Xeno to Eun-ooh.

2010s
In the 2010s, Eun-ooh switched her focus from being a singer to mainly working as a composer, songwriter, vocalist, and producer for K-pop music and Korean TV series. For example, she worked on the OST "Everyday" for Korean Drama A Gentleman's Dignity in 2012. Since then, she has been writing melodies, lyrics, and helped produce songs for some of South Korea's best known K-pop artists, such as Sistar, BoA, and Jun Hyo Seong.

Discography

Singles
+Niga Mwonde(니가 뭔데)- July 20, 2007

+Who are you? sexy my boy! – March 7, 2008

+Naege Dasi(내게 다시) – June 23, 2008

+Woori Ai(우리아이) – March 15, 2013

Soundtracks
+A Gentleman's Dignity OST Part 2 – "Everyday" – June 3, 2012

Albums
+Seventeen Xeno – September 20, 2007

Songwriter/Lyricist/Producer Discography

K-POP

Secret Number  
 Holiday [from "Who Dis? - Single"]
 Privacy [from "Got That Boom - Single"]
 Dangerous In Love [from "Fire Saturday - Single"]

ShaFLA 
 Ddu-Ru-Ddu-Ppa-Ra-Ppa

Jun Hyo Seong 
 Dear moon
 Hello
 Follow me
 I got you
 Taxi Driver 
 How Can I

SONAMOO 
 Round N Round
 Liar
 I do love you
 Closer
 Into Me

Secret 
 U R Fired

Song Ji Eun (Secret) 
 JANUS (Intro.) [from Mini Album - "25"]
 La Boum [from Mini Album - "25"]

Shin Hye Sung 
 Pretty Girl

B.A.P 
 Today

Wonder Girls 
 Sorry [from Mini Album - "Wonder Party"]

Lee Jong Hyun (CNBLUE) & JUNIEL 
 Love Falls

IVY 
 Firefly [from Mini Album - "Interview"]
 Like a movie [from Mini Album - "Interview"]

Ailee 
 Filling Up My Glass (Co-produced by 'Lee Jong Hyun(CNBLUE)')

EXID 
 Wi Are/Up & Down (Chinese version)
 Cream (Chinese version)

BoA 
 Hurricane Venus
 Adrenaline

Sistar 
 SHAKE IT
 Don't Be Such A Baby (Feat. Giriboy)
 TOUCH MY BODY
 I Swear
 Naughty Hands (Feat. Verbal Jint)
 I Choose To Love You
 SoYou X JunggiGo - Some (feat. Lil Boi of Geeks)
 SoYou, Kwon Soonil, Park Yongin(Urban Zakapa) - The Space Between[Ssum]
 SoYou X Kwon Jung Yeol - Lean On Me
 SoYou, Giriboy - Pillow (Feat. KIHYUN)
 SoYou, Mad Clown - Stupid In Love
 San E, Hyolyn - Coach Me (Feat. Joo Heon)
 Hyolyn - Lonely

WJSN (Cosmic Girls) 
 Closer to you
 Secret / Mo Mo Mo / Catch me [not verified]

4Minute 
 Gayoon & HyunA (4Minute) - Come In [from "4Minute World" (5th Mini Album)]

KOREAN DRAMA OST 
 Kim Feel - Neighborhood Lawyer Jo Deul Ho OST (Walk to the sky)
 Tiffany(Girls' Generation) - Only one - BLOOD OST
 M.C The Max - U - It's Okay, That's Love OST Part. 7
 G.NA - SECRET - The Night Watchman's Journal OST
 Future Choice - Jung Yong Hwa(CNBLUE), Yoon Eun Hye(Actress), Lee Dong Gun(Actor)
 Ken(VIXX) - In The Name Of Love (English ver.) - The Heirs OST
 Zion - Never Love Me - Bride of The Sun OST Part 1

J-POP

Song Ji Eun (Secret) 
 La Boum (Japanese Version)

N.Flying 
 Kiss me, Miss me
 Bitter Sweet

References

External links 

1990 births
K-pop singers
Living people
People from Daejeon